Arboledas is a colombian municipality and town located in the department of North Santander.

References
  Government of Norte de Santander - Arboledas
  Arboledas official website

Municipalities of the Norte de Santander Department